Jenny Lorenzo is a Cuban-American actress, comedian, writer, producer, and content creator. She is mostly known for her YouTube sketches inspired by her Cuban heritage, and was one of the co-founders of BuzzFeed's Pero Like.

Career

2016: Pero Like and We Are Mitú 
In early 2016, Jenny Lorenzo was one of the co-founders for BuzzFeed's Pero Like (originally called BuzzFeed Sol). Lorenzo and Brittany Ashley appeared in small roles for "Gente-fied", a mini-webseries produced by America Ferrera (which later became a Netflix original series in 2020). BuzzFeed Motion Pictures terminated both staff members for violating their contract on July 10, 2016. Even though both Lorenzo and Ashley worked on the Netflix series in their free time, they were not authorized to work with other companies without prior permission.

After Lorenzo's termination, it has sparked conversations on the need for BuzzFeed staff to unionize. It also sparked the trend of "Why I Left BuzzFeed" videos, where people explain why they decided to quit their job at BuzzFeed. Safiya Nygaard, The Try Guys (left BuzzFeed in 2018), and Michelle Khare are known for this. After this event, Lorenzo started producing videos for We Are Mitú.

2017–present: YouTube 
Lorenzo quit producing videos with We Are Mitú. She started making videos for her YouTube channel that involves her Cuban heritage, such as her iconic "Abuela" character. Lorenzo started voice acting a recurring character named Lupe Gonzales, for Cartoon Network's Latin-American show: Victor and Valentino. She is one of the hosts of the weekly webseries, "What's Up, Disney+" with Andre Meadows. She also co-hosts a podcast called "Hyphenated" with Joanna Hausmann, where they discuss about "Latinx identity in real life and in the media".

Lorenzo's voice acts as five recurring characters for Jellystone!. Lorenzo also voiced a character for Dan Povenmire's Hamster & Gretel, this is her first time voice acting a character for Disney.

Filmography

Television

Webseries

Podcast

References 

Living people
American people of Cuban descent
Cuban women comedians
American YouTubers
Year of birth missing (living people)